The Amazing Maze Game is an arcade video game developed by Midway, released in 1976.

Gameplay

The object of the game is for the player to find their way out of a challenging maze before their opponent.  Users can play as single player and compete against the computer or play against a friend in two player mode.

External links
The Amazing Maze Game at Arcade-History

1976 video games
Arcade video games
Arcade-only video games
Maze games
Midway video games
Video games developed in the United States